|}

The St Hugh's Stakes is a Listed flat horse race in Great Britain open to two-year-old fillies. It is run at Newbury over a distance of 5 furlongs and 34 yards (1,037 metres), and it is scheduled to take place each year in August.

The race was awarded Listed status in 2003.

Records
Leading jockey since 1988 (3 wins):
 Frankie Dettori - Head Over Heels (1996), Abby Road (2006), Sand Vixen (2009)
 Oisin Murphy -  Shumookhi (2018), Zoetic (2020), Tardis (2021) 

Leading trainer since 1988 (3 wins):
 Richard Hannon Sr. – Bocas Rose (1988), Amazing Dream (1998), Cake (2007)

Winners since 1988

See also
 Horse racing in Great Britain
 List of British flat horse races

References
 Racing Post:

Flat races in Great Britain
Newbury Racecourse
Flat horse races for two-year-old fillies